Bill "Hershey" Nershi (born September 16, 1961 in New Jersey) is a founding member and acoustic guitarist for The String Cheese Incident, from Boulder, Colorado.
The String Cheese Incident took a break starting in the summer of 2007, but the band got back together in 2009. Nershi is currently active in multiple projects, including SCI, Honkytonk Homeslice as well as a project with Leftover Salmon mandolinist Drew Emmitt, known as the Emmitt-Nershi Band. He currently lives in Colorado and is also a visual artist.

References

External links
String Cheese Incident Website
2015 Bill Nershi interview on Guitar.com

1961 births
Living people
American bluegrass guitarists
American male guitarists
American country guitarists
American rock guitarists
20th-century American guitarists
20th-century American male musicians
The String Cheese Incident members